John Strike  was a professional baseball player who played pitcher in the Major Leagues for the 1886 Philadelphia Quakers.   He played in the Pennsylvania State Association in 1887.

External links

1865 births
Major League Baseball pitchers
Baseball players from Philadelphia
Philadelphia Quakers players
19th-century baseball players
Year of death missing
Wilkes-Barre Coal Barons players